Ujan is a village in the Ashtarak Municipality of the Aragatsotn Province of Armenia. 

Ujan is home to the first statue of General Andranik erected in Armenia. It was secretly erected at night on 4 June 1967.

Gallery

References 

Mithila
World Gazetteer: Armenia – World-Gazetteer.com
Report of the results of the 2001 Armenian Census

Populated places in Aragatsotn Province